Robert E. Seiler (December 5, 1912 – April 13, 1998) was a judge on the Missouri Supreme Court from 1967 until 1982, and the chief justice of that same court from 1975 to 1977.  He attended the University of Missouri in Columbia.  He served in the U.S. Army from 1942 until 1945.

Sources

1912 births
1998 deaths
Chief Justices of the Supreme Court of Missouri
University of Missouri alumni
20th-century American judges
Judges of the Supreme Court of Missouri
University of Missouri School of Law alumni